Heart of the Comet is a novel by David Brin and Gregory Benford about human space travel to Halley's Comet published in 1986. Its publication coincided with the comet's 1986 approach to the Earth.

Written in the third person, the perspective alternates between the three main characters, the "spacer" Carl Osborn, the computer programmer Virginia Herbert and the doctor and geneticist Saul Lintz.

Overview 
The novel tells the story of an expedition beginning in the year 2061 to capture Halley's Comet into a short period orbit so that its resources can be mined. The discovery of life on the comet and the subsequent survival struggle against the indigenous lifeforms and the illnesses and infections they cause leads to a breakdown of the expedition crew and the creation of factions based around political beliefs, nationality and genetic differences between the "percells"—genetically enhanced humans—and the "orthos"—unmodified humans. As well as the fighting between these factions, Earth rejects the mission due to fear of contamination from the halleyform life and attempts to destroy the comet and those living upon it. Eventually the mission crew on Halley are forced to accept that they can never return to earth and create a new biosphere within the comet's core and in some cases evolve into symbiotic organisms with the halleyform life.

Subplots within the novel include the love triangle between the three major characters, Saul's quest for immortality through the creation of clones of himself and Virginia's development and nurture of the bio-organic stochastic computer JonVon, into whom Saul eventually transfers her consciousness before her brain dies as a result of an accident. The description of many of the interactions with JonVon and this final transference of consciousness is similar to the descriptions of the matrix in the William Gibson novel Neuromancer.

Characters

Main
Carl Osborn - spacer, percell
Virginia Kaninamanu Herbert - computer programmer, percell
Saul Lintz - doctor and geneticist, ortho

Minor characters
Miguel Cruz-Mendoza - Captain of the Edmund Halley, ortho
Otis Sergeov - Spacer Second Class, percell
Joao Quiverian - astronomer, ortho
Lt. Col. Suleiman Ould-Harrad - spacer, ortho
Lani Nguyen -  spacer, ortho
Jeffers - spacer, percell
Akio Matsudo - doctor
Bethany Oakes - doctor
Nickolas Malenkov - doctor
Marguerite van/von Zoon - doctor
Jim Vidor - spacer
Ingersoll - percell
Linbarger - doctor, ortho
Keoki Anuenue - med-tech, ortho

Background characters
Simon Percell - geneticist
JonVon - quasi-sentient computer personality

Themes
As an example of the hard science fiction subgenre, the story is meant to be scientifically plausible. Social and political issues such as racism and diaspora are also present, as well as social arguments surrounding issues such as genetic engineering and cloning and exploration of more philosophical subjects such as immortality and transhumanism.

External links 
 

1986 American novels
1986 science fiction novels
Collaborative novels
Novels by Gregory Benford
Novels by David Brin
Fiction about Halley's Comet
Fiction set in the 2060s
2061